The tree line is the edge of the habitat at which trees are capable of growing. It is found at high elevations and high latitudes. Beyond the tree line, trees cannot tolerate the environmental conditions (usually cold temperatures, extreme snowpack, or associated lack of available moisture). The tree line is sometimes distinguished from a lower timberline, which is the line below which trees form a forest with a closed canopy.

At the tree line, tree growth is often sparse, stunted, and deformed by wind and cold. This is sometimes known as krummholz (German for "crooked wood").

The tree line often appears well-defined, but it can be a more gradual transition. Trees grow shorter and often at lower densities as they approach the tree line, above which they are unable to grow at all. Given a certain latitude, the tree line is approximately 300 to 1000 meters below the permanent snow line and roughly parallel to it.

Causes

Due to their vertical structure, trees are more susceptible to cold than more ground-hugging forms of plants. Summer warmth generally sets the limit to which tree growth can occur, for while tree line conifers are very frost-hardy during most of the year, they become sensitive to just 1 or 2 degrees of frost in mid-summer. A series of warm summers in the 1940s seems to have permitted the establishment of "significant numbers" of spruce seedlings above the previous treeline in the hills near Fairbanks, Alaska. Survival depends on a sufficiency of new growth to support the tree. Wind can mechanically damage tree tissues directly, including blasting with windborne particles, and may also contribute to the desiccation of foliage, especially of shoots that project above snow cover.

The actual tree line is set by the mean temperature, while the realized tree line may be affected by disturbances, such as logging. Most human activities cannot change the actual tree line, unless they affect the climate. The seasonal mean temperature is taken over all days whose mean temperature is above . A growing season of 94 days above that temperature is required for tree growth.

Types 

Several types of tree lines are defined in ecology and geography:

Alpine

An alpine tree line is the highest elevation that sustains trees; higher up it is too cold, or the snow cover lasts for too much of the year, to sustain trees. The climate above the tree line of mountains is called an alpine climate, and the habitat can be described as the alpine zone. Treelines on north-facing slopes in the northern hemisphere are lower than on south-facing slopes, because the increased shade on north-facing slopes means the snowpack takes longer to melt. This shortens the growing season for trees. In the southern hemisphere, the south-facing slopes have the shorter growing season.

The alpine tree line boundary is seldom abrupt: it usually forms a transition zone between closed forest below and treeless alpine zone above. This zone of transition occurs "near the top of the tallest peaks in the northeastern United States, high up on the giant volcanoes in central Mexico, and on mountains in each of the 11 western states and throughout much of Canada and Alaska". Environmentally dwarfed shrubs (krummholz) commonly form the upper limit.

The decrease in air temperature with increasing elevation creates the alpine climate. Skin effects and topography can create microclimates that alter the general cooling trend.

Compared with arctic tree lines, alpine tree lines may receive fewer than half of the number of degree days (above ) based on air temperature, but because solar radiation intensities are greater at alpine than at arctic tree lines the number of degree days calculated from leaf temperatures may be very similar.

At the alpine tree line, tree growth is inhibited when excessive snow lingers and shortens the growing season to the point where new growth would not have time to harden before the onset of fall frost. Moderate snowpack, however, may promote tree growth by insulating the trees from extreme cold during the winter, curtailing water loss, and prolonging a supply of moisture through the early part of the growing season. However, snow accumulation in sheltered gullies in the Selkirk Mountains of southeastern British Columbia causes the tree line to be  lower than on exposed intervening shoulders.

In some mountainous areas, higher elevations above the condensation line, or on equator-facing and leeward slopes, can result in low rainfall and increased exposure to solar radiation. This dries out the soil, resulting in a localized arid environment unsuitable for trees. Many south-facing ridges of the mountains of the Western U.S. have a lower treeline than the northern faces because of increased sun exposure and aridity. Hawaii's treeline of about  feet is also above the condensation zone and results due to a lack of moisture.

Exposure
On coasts and isolated mountains, the tree line is often much lower than in corresponding altitudes inland and in larger, more complex mountain systems, because strong winds reduce tree growth. In addition, the lack of suitable soil, such as along talus slopes or exposed rock formations, prevents trees from gaining an adequate foothold and exposes them to drought and sun.

Arctic

The arctic tree line is the northernmost latitude in the Northern Hemisphere where trees can grow; farther north, it is too cold all year round to sustain trees. Extremely cold temperatures, especially when prolonged, can freeze the internal sap of trees, killing them. In addition, permafrost in the soil can prevent trees from getting their roots deep enough for the necessary structural support.

Unlike alpine tree lines, the northern tree line occurs at low elevations. The arctic forest–tundra transition zone in northwestern Canada varies in width, perhaps averaging  and widening markedly from west to east, in contrast with the telescoped alpine timberlines. North of the arctic tree line lies the low-growing tundra, and southwards lies the boreal forest.

Two zones can be distinguished in the arctic tree line: a forest–tundra zone of scattered patches of krummholz or stunted trees, with larger trees along rivers and on sheltered sites set in a matrix of tundra; and "open boreal forest" or "lichen woodland", consisting of open groves of erect trees underlain by a carpet of Cladonia spp. lichens. The proportion of trees to lichen mat increases southwards towards the "forest line", where trees cover 50 percent or more of the landscape.

Antarctic

A southern treeline exists in the New Zealand Subantarctic Islands and the Australian Macquarie Island, with places where mean annual temperatures above  support trees and woody plants, and those below  do not.
Another treeline exists in the southwesternmost parts of the Magellanic subpolar forests ecoregion, where the forest merges into the subantarctic tundra (termed Magellanic moorland or Magellanic tundra). For example, the northern halves of Hoste and Navarino Islands have Nothofagus antarctica forests but the southern parts consist of moorlands and tundra.

Tree species near tree line

Some typical Arctic and alpine tree line tree species (note the predominance of conifers):

Australia
Snow gum (Eucalyptus pauciflora)

Eurasia

Dahurian larch (Larix gmelinii)
Macedonian pine (Pinus peuce)
Swiss pine (Pinus cembra)
Mountain pine (Pinus mugo)
Arctic white birch (Betula pubescens subsp. tortuosa)
Rowan (Sorbus aucuparia)

North America

Subalpine fir (Abies lasiocarpa)
Subalpine larch (Larix lyallii)
Mountain hemlock (Tsuga mertensiana)
Alaska yellow cedar (Chaemaecyparis nootkatensis)
Engelmann spruce (Picea engelmannii)
Whitebark pine (Pinus albicaulis)
Great Basin bristlecone pine (Pinus longaeva)
Rocky Mountains bristlecone pine (Pinus aristata)
Foxtail pine (Pinus balfouriana)
Limber pine (Pinus flexilis)
Potosi pinyon (Pinus culminicola)
Black spruce (Picea mariana)
White spruce (Picea glauca)
Tamarack (Larix laricina)
Hartweg's pine (Pinus hartwegii)

South America

Antarctic beech (Nothofagus antarctica)
Lenga beech (Nothofagus pumilio)
Alder (Alnus acuminata)
Pino del cerro (Podocarpus parlatorei)
Polylepis (Polylepis tarapacana)
Eucalyptus (not native to South America but grown in large amounts in the high Andes).

Worldwide distribution

Alpine tree lines
The alpine tree line at a location is dependent on local variables, such as aspect of slope, rain shadow and proximity to either geographical pole. In addition, in some tropical or island localities, the lack of biogeographical access to species that have evolved in a subalpine environment can result in lower tree lines than one might expect by climate alone.

Here is a list of approximate tree lines from locations around the globe:

Arctic tree lines
Like the alpine tree lines shown above, polar tree lines are heavily influenced by local variables such as aspect of slope and degree of shelter. In addition, permafrost has a major impact on the ability of trees to place roots into the ground. When roots are too shallow, trees are susceptible to windthrow and erosion. Trees can often grow in river valleys at latitudes where they could not grow on a more exposed site. Maritime influences such as ocean currents also play a major role in determining how far from the equator trees can grow as well as the warm summers experienced in extreme continental climates. In northern inland Scandinavia there is substantial maritime influence on high parallels that keep winters relatively mild, but enough inland effect to have summers well above the threshold for the tree line. Here are some typical polar treelines:

Antarctic tree lines
Trees exist on Tierra del Fuego (55°S) at the southern end of South America, but generally not on subantarctic islands and not in Antarctica. Therefore, there is no explicit Antarctic tree line.

Kerguelen Island (49°S), South Georgia (54°S), and other subantarctic islands are all so heavily wind-exposed and with a too-cold summer climate (tundra) that none have any indigenous tree species. The Falkland Islands (51°S) summer temperature is near the limit, but the islands are also treeless, although some planted trees exist.

In addition, no trees survive on any of the subantarctic islands near the peninsula.

These trees seldom grow above  in height and they get smaller as one gains altitude, so that by  they are waist-high. These islands have only between 600 and 800 hours of sun annually. Campbell Island (52°S) further south is treeless, except for one stunted Spruce, planted by scientists. The climate on these islands is not severe, but tree growth is limited by almost continual rain and wind. Winters are mild  but wet. Macquarie Island (Australia) is located at 54°S and has no vegetation beyond snow grass and alpine grasses and mosses.

See also

Montane ecosystems
Ecotone: a transition between two adjacent ecological communities
Edge effects: the effect of contrasting environments on an ecosystem
Massenerhebung effect
Snow line

References

Further reading 

 Line
Conifers
Forest ecology
Montane ecology
Climate zones